The 4th All-Africa Games were played from August 1, 1987, to August 12, 1987, in Nairobi, Kenya. 42 countries participated in fourteen sports.

From the beginning the intent had been to hold the African Games every four years. Economic difficulties and general civil unrest had never allowed this to happen. The fourth Games were no exception. Originally scheduled for 1982, a weak Kenyan economy slowed preparations. The Chinese helped provide the necessary funds and manpower to begin building Kasarani Stadium, but too late to hold the games on schedule. It was suggested at one time that Tunis, Tunisia arrange the fourth games in 1982 and Nairobi take its turn in the fifth games in 1986. This proposal was voted down, but the Nairobi games dates were pushed back to 1986. This was still not enough time for the Kenyans to ready themselves and the games finally opened in August 1987. The Games have kept to the four-year schedule since this edition.

A torch was relayed from Nairobi to the Kenyan coast, the Kenyan highlands and back to Nairobi where World Champion John Ngugi carried it into the stadium in front of an enthusiastic crowd of 80,000.

Organizational difficulties with housing and facilities, typical in events such as these, were evident in the Nairobi games as well, but in the end the games concluded without undue calamity.

Egypt won the soccer final from host Kenya on the final day, and finished at the top of the medals table once again.

At the closing ceremonies the torch was passed to Cairo, Egypt to begin preparations for the Vth All-Africa Games in 1991.

Medal table

Sports

Athletics

Three athletes, two female and one male, won more than one event:
 Selina Chirchir, Kenya (800 metres and 1500 metres)
 Maria Usifo, Nigeria (100 m hurdles and 400 m hurdles)
 Adewale Olukoju, Nigeria (shot put and discus throw)

In addition, Nigeria won all four relay races; 4x100 metres and 4x400 metres for men and for women.

Some new women's events were added: 3000 metres, 10000 metres, 400 metres hurdles and 5000 metres track walk. Additionally, the obsoleted pentathlon event was replaced by the heptathlon.

Basketball
 Men: 1. Angola, 2. Senegal
 Women: 1. Zaire

Boxing

Field hockey
Field hockey was part of the games for the first time. The venue was City Park Hockey Stadium.
 Men: 1. Kenya, 2. Zimbabwe, 3. Egypt, 4. Ghana, 5. Tanzania, 7. Zambia

Football

The football tournament was won by Egypt. It was the first Games in which the host country did not win, although the host Kenya finished second. Malawi won their first All-Africa medal.

Handball

 Men: 1. Algeria, 2. Congo, 3. Egypt
 Women: 1. Cote d'Ivoire, 2. Congo, 3. Cameroon

Table tennis

Taekwondo
The taekwondo competition took place at Desai Memorial Hall between August 1 and August 4, 1987. The men's winners were:

Volleyball
 Men: 1. Cameroon, 2. Algeria, 3. Nigeria
 Women: 1. Egypt, 2. Kenya, 3. Mauritius

References

External links
 Sports 123

 
A
All-Africa Games
All-Africa Games
African Games
Sport in Nairobi
All-Africa Games, 1987
International sports competitions hosted by Kenya
All-Africa Games
All-Africa Games, 1987